The men's long jump was one of six jumping events on the Athletics at the 1908 Summer Olympics programme in London. The competition was held on July 22, 1908. Thirty-two athletes from 9 nations competed. NOCs could enter up to 12 athletes. The event was won by Frank Irons of the United States, the nation's fourth consecutive victory in the first four Olympic Games. Calvin Bricker of Canada took bronze to break up the Americans' attempt at another sweep (which they had accomplished in 1896 and 1904).

Background

This was the fourth appearance of the event, which is one of 12 athletics events to have been held at every Summer Olympics. None of the jumpers from 1904 returned. The world's best jumpers, American Myer Prinstein and Irishman Peter O'Connor, had retired; there was no favorite coming into the event.

Canada, the Netherlands, and Norway each made their first appearance in the event. The United States appeared for the fourth time, the only nation to have long jumpers at each of the Games so far.

Competition format

The 1908 format returned to the two-round format used in 1900. Only the top three jumpers in the qualifying round advanced to the final. Each jumper had three jumps in the qualifying round; finalists received an additional three jumps, with qualifying round jumps still counting if the final jumps were not better.

Records

These are the standing world and Olympic records (in metres) prior to the 1908 Summer Olympics.

Frank Irons set two Olympic records. At first he jumped 7.44 metres and finally he set the new Olympic record with 7.48 metres.

Schedule

Results

All jumpers performed three jumps. The best three made another three attempts to improve their marks. Best marks are known for the top twenty jumpers, but no information about marks or placement for the bottom twelve.

References

Sources
 Official Report of the Games of the IV Olympiad (1908).
 De Wael, Herman. Herman's Full Olympians: "Athletics 1908". Accessed 7 April 2006.

Athletics at the 1908 Summer Olympics
Long jump at the Olympics